Kolejarz Opole (Railwayman Opole) is a motorcycle speedway team based in Opole, Poland. They currently race in the Polish Speedway Second League (2. Liga).

History
The club race at the Municipal Speedway Stadium or Mariana Spychała Stadium named after a former rider and coach Mariana Spychała. The speedway track was constructed in 1957. 

On 5 April 1957, the speedway club was officially founded as Klub Sportowy Kolejarz Opole and made its debut in the Polish leagues in 1961. The club's first honour was winning the Polish Speedway First League in 1969 and they went on to win the league three more times in 1974, 1980, 1987. 

After their 1969 victory they competed in the highest league and won the bronze medal in 1970.

In, 1989 Wojciech Załuski won the Golden Helmet.

From 1994 to 1997 the club raced as CemWap Opole named after their sponsor the CemWap cement and lime company. The club experienced problems shortly afterwards and disbanded but reformed as Towarzystwo Żużlowe Opole, sponsored by Noban. They competed as Noban from 1999 until 2002.

The club later won the 2.Liga in 2004.

Teams

2023 team

 Robert Chmiel
 Adam Ellis
 Filip Hjelmland
 Oskar Polis
 Mathias Thörnblom
/ Andrei Kudryashov
 Jakub Fabisz
 Esben Hjerrild
 Oskar Stepien
 Kacper Linek-Rekus
 Dastin Lukaszczyk

Previous teams

2022 team

 Jacob Thorssell
 Oskar Polis
 Adrian Cyfer
 Esben Hjerrild
 Karol Baran
 Jakub Krawczyk
 Petr Chlupáč
 Mathias Thörnblom

Notable riders

References 

Polish speedway teams
Opole